Albert Desmond Collins (15 April 1923 – 17 June 2017) was an English professional footballer who played as an outside right in the Football League for Chesterfield, Halifax Town, Carlisle United, Barrow, Bournemouth & Boscombe Athletic, Shrewsbury Town and Accrington Stanley. He also played in the Midland Football League for Boston United.

References

1923 births
2017 deaths
Footballers from Chesterfield
English footballers
Association football outside forwards
Chesterfield F.C. players
Halifax Town A.F.C. players
Carlisle United F.C. players
Barrow A.F.C. players
AFC Bournemouth players
Shrewsbury Town F.C. players
Accrington Stanley F.C. (1891) players
Boston United F.C. players
English Football League players
Midland Football League players